Asia Talent Cup is a motorcycle road racing competition intended for young participants in Asia and Oceania. This competition is organized by Dorna, which also controls Grand Prix motorcycle racing and Superbike World Championship. The Asia Talent Cup was founded in 2013 and had its inaugural season in 2014. After three seasons under contract with Shell Advance, starting from the 2017 season, Idemitsu will be the main sponsor of the Asia Talent Cup.

Alberto Puig was appointed as Director of the Asia Talent Cup from 2014.

Motorcycle specifications 
The series uses the One Make Bike system so that all racers will use the same motorcycle, namely the Honda NSF250R.

Winners by season

References

External links 

 

 
Motorcycle road racing series
Motorsport in Asia
Motorsport in Oceania
Asian youth sports competitions
Recurring sporting events established in 2013
2013 establishments in Asia
2013 establishments in Oceania